De Geest may refer to:

 Gerrit De Geest, a Belgian legal scholar and writer
 Wybrand de Geest, a Dutch Golden Age portrait painter from Friesland
 Tablet De Geest, a wooden tablet found in the Hoq Cave on the island of Socotra, in the Guardafui Channel off the tip of the Horn of Africa